Malik Andil Habshi, better known by his regnal title Saifuddin Firuz Shah was the second "Habshi" ruler of the Bengal Sultanate's Habshi dynasty. He was a former army commander of the Sultanate's Ilyas Shahi dynasty.

Biography
Andil was the army commander of the Ilyas Shahi dynasty and took power after killing the rebel Sultan, Barbak Shah II, in 1487. After claiming the throne, he styled himself as Saifuddin Firuz Shah. It is said that Andil was an eunuch.

He is often considered as the real founder of the Habshi rule in Bengal as the previous Shahzada Barbak only ruled for a few months. This is reinforced in an inscription found in Garh Jaripa in Sreebardi, Sherpur, where he was ordering the construction of someone's tomb and referred to himself as Sultan al-Ahad (the first Sultan). The four corners of the person's tomb each bore the names of the Rashidun caliphs and the inscription sent blessings upon the Islamic prophet Muhammad, his daughter Fatimah and her two sons Hasan and Husayn. This inscription can now be found in the Indian Museum, Kolkata. Firuz Shah minted coins during his reign and mentions the historical town of Mahmudabad.

He is described as a patron of architecture and calligraphy in Bengal. He ordered Majlis Sa'd to build a mosque in Maldah. On 18 January 1489, he ordered Mukhlis Khan to the construction of a ten-domed mosque in Goamatli, Maldah. In the same year, he also ordered Ulugh Ali Zafar Khan to construct a mosque in Kalna. It is also considered that the Bokainagar and Tajpur forts were established by Majlis Khan Humayun during his expedition to Kamarupa, under the orders of Firuz Shah. He also built the Katra mosque in Maldah and the inscription contains authentic Tughra calligraphy.

His most famous architecture is the Firuz Minar. Named after himself, it is a large five-storeyed tower situated in Gauda. The construction started in 1485 before his reign, but was completed in 1489 to commemorates his victories in the battlefield. According to tradition, he threw the chief architect from the topmost storey as he was not satisfied with the tower's height and wanted it to be taller.

Death
His rule lasted two years until his death in 1489 where he was succeeded by his adopted son, Mahmud Shah II. Most historians consider that he died of natural causes while some such as Ghulam Husain Salim and Jadunath Sarkar say that he was also killed by one of the Abyssinian palace-guards.

See also
List of rulers of Bengal
History of Bengal
History of India

References

Sultans of Bengal
1489 deaths
Year of birth unknown
15th-century Indian monarchs
Habshis of Bengal